The Heckler & Koch PSG1 (Präzisionsschützengewehr, German for "precision shooting rifle") is a semi-automatic sniper rifle designed and produced by the German company Heckler & Koch.

Development
This rifle is said to have been developed in response to the Munich massacre at the 1972 Summer Olympics. The West German police units at the time lacked the precision shooting capability to effectively neutralize the terrorists to prevent the hostages being killed. H&K was then commissioned to create a high-accuracy, large-magazine capacity, semi-automatic rifle for law enforcement and military use.

In addition, the rifle has been licensed for local production in Pakistan by Pakistan Ordnance Factories (POF) as the PSR-90 and Mexico by DGIM as the Fusil Morelos Bicentenario, a heavily redesigned variant featuring an AR-15 style forward assist.

Design details
The PSG1 is mechanically based on the Heckler & Koch G3 battle rifle that employs a roller-delayed blowback operating system. Its shot-to-shot variation is expected to be better than 1 minute of angle (MOA) with match ammunition. This level of accuracy is only average compared to most modern bolt action sniper rifles, but is still exceptional for a semi-automatic rifle and at one time was claimed to be "one of the most accurate semi-automatic sniper rifles in the world."

The rifle has a strengthened receiver with rails welded over the channels where a retractable buttstock would slide and features numerous other upgrades and such to meet the necessities of police sniper units. The two sliding locking rollers that hold the bolt in battery during firing are not cylindrical shaped like in normal G3 rifles, but semi-cylindrical shaped to offer a non-random more precise positioning on corresponding flat surfaces in the barrel extension locking recesses. The PSG1 also features a low-noise bolt closing device (similar to the forward assist on many M16 rifles).

PSG1s are not supplied with iron sights but come equipped with the Hensoldt ZF 6×42 PSG1 scope with an illuminated reticle. The scope has a built-in bullet drop compensation range adjustment feature which can be adjusted from 100 to 600 m.

It has a heavy free-floating barrel with polygonal rifling and an adjustable stock. The stock is of high impact matte black plastic and has a high degree of adjustment. It is adjustable for length, and includes a pivoting butt cap and a vertically-adjustable cheekpiece. The forend is fitted with a T-way rail for sling swivel or tripod.

The rifle also features a removable and adjustable trigger unit, for further individual fitting of the rifle. The trigger pull can be modified and the whole assembly is removable from the pistol grip. The pistol grip is of a target-style with an adjustable palm shelf.

The PSG1's official suppressor is from Brügger & Thomet (B and T).

PSG1A1
The PSG1A1 variant was introduced by Heckler & Koch in 2006, and features two major improvements. First, the cocking handle was relocated a couple of degrees counter-clockwise. This was due to the fact that when locked rearward, it could physically interfere with the long scopes often used on the rifles. The second modification involved the replacement of the outdated Hensoldt scope. Non-police users often found the scope's 600 m range limitation and simple crosshairs inadequate for their needs. In addition, the rechargeable batteries are difficult to recharge and for which to find replacements. A final fault is that Hensoldt does not service the scope in the United States. For these reasons, the PSG1A1 has been outfitted with a Schmidt & Bender 3–12×50 Police Marksman II scope, mounted on  rings. To remedy brass ejection a brass catcher must be installed.

MSG90

The MSG90 (Militärisches Scharfschützengewehr, German for "militarized sharp-shooting rifle") is a militarized variant of the PSG1 that is both strengthened and lightened while less expensive. Compared to the PSG1 which is regarded as a pure sniper rifle, the MSG90 can fill the role of a designated marksman rifle.

The PSG1 and MSG90 have different trigger packs. The MSG90 uses a modified version of the push pin trigger packs of H&K roller-delayed select-fire assault rifles. The composite shoulder stock of the MSG90 is adjustable for height (cheek), length of pull (shoulder), and is smaller and lighter than that of the PSG1. MSG90s have a slightly shorter contoured barrel to help with harmonic stabilization and consistent whip instead of the PSG1's heavy barrel, but remain free-floating. As a result, these particular MSG90 A1s have a threaded barrel capable of attaching a suppressor, which is an advantage over the PSG1.

The sighting system uses the multipurpose Weaver rail mount rather than the Picatinny rail for affixing sighting systems which can be purchased separately. This same scope mounting system is used on the HK21E, HK23E, and G41 (discontinued) series.

The barrel is weighted at the muzzle to aid harmonic stabilization of barrel whip to enhance accuracy. The addition of a flash suppressor adds to the overall length.

MSG90A1

MSG90A2

Users

See also
 Walther WA 2000, contemporary and direct competitor
 DSR-50
 Dragunov SVD

References

External links
 Heckler & Koch—PSG1A1 official page
 PSG1 on Mel's SniperCentral
 HKPro
 2008 Heckler & Koch Military and LE brochure
  
 Hk MSG90 Video

Roller-delayed blowback firearms
PSG1
Cold War weapons of Germany
Police weapons
7.62×51mm NATO semi-automatic rifles
Sniper rifles of Germany
Weapons and ammunition introduced in 1972